Berkeley County is the name of two counties in the United States:

 Berkeley County, South Carolina 
 Berkeley County, West Virginia